is an  elevated linear park, greenway and rail trail    in Higashi ward, Fukuoka, Japan. The park is located in Fukuoka's green belt, and is an example of the reuse of abandoned railway land in an urban setting. Nishi-Nippon Railroad sold the property to the city in 1980.

Location

Maidashi Ryokuchi was designed as a children's playground with a public water fountain, playing equipment, and a nature trail. The barrier-free nature trail provides a recreation area for older people and for students from the nearby Fukuoka Junior High School. Located near Yume Town Hakata, it is overlooked by the local intermediate school. The park is a safe place for children to play. It is the biggest of the ten public parks in the Maidashi school district.

Historical development

The site of Maidashi Ryokuchi was originally the Hakata Bay in the Edo period. At the beginning of the Meiji era, it was reclaimed by a large-scale landfill. In those days, the reclamation was done by human labor (no engine-powered equipment) to carry dirt with straw mat onto the silt layer.

In 1980, after the Nishi-tetsu Takechi line ceased operations, the grounds were bought by Fukuoka City Council. After six years of construction as part of the redevelopment of Maidashi, the land was finally transformed into the park we have today. The park was built in keeping with the low-rise apartments  surrounding it and as a garden city.

 

As the property was not originally designed as a park, the form of site was elongated, conforming to the shape of the railway line. At the gate of the park, there was Maidashi 3 chome depot which is now absent. At present, Nishi tetsu (Nishi-Nippon Railroad Co., Ltd.) Bus is operated instead of the railway. The park is not independent as the eighth Maidashi green belt, there are battery of green belts with serial numbers as province. As presented above, arising from the unusual history of the installation, the Maidashi green belt gives the citizens opportunities to learn from the modern history of Fukuoka since the Meiji era.

As a route to youme Town Hakata
At the line extension of this belt, there is an area of pre-road over Route 3 youme Town Hakata from Prefectural Road 517 to youme Town Hakata. Between this green belt and youme Town Hakata, there is Route 3 with a pedestrian bridge built over it where children can cross safely.

Voluntary management
The management of Maidashi Ryokuchi is run by the Maidashi Green Belt Community Association, which employs a model of self-management. General maintenance of the area and its amenities is carried out by local residents on a volunteer basis and is supported by the Fukuoka City Council.

Associated Parks

Maidashi 1st park
Maidashi 1st park is a small garden located next to Maidashi Ryokuchi. The 8th Maidashi Ryokuchi is a children's playground with a sandpit.

Nearest stations
Fukuoka City Subway Hakozaki-Miyamae Station
Maidashi-Kyūdai-byōin-mae Station

See also 
 Maidashi
 Greenway, London
 High Line
 Bloomingdale Trail
 Reading Viaduct
 Lowline (park)

Notes

External links

 Fukuoka Transportation Authority,  Fukuokasi subway (Maidashi kyudai byouin mae)
 Miyaji gake sen Maidashi ryokuchi, official website
Parks in Fukuoka city Azuma ward
Kyushu denpa dori Nishi-tetsu Miyaji-dake sen bubun haishi tokushu No.3 Maidashi ryokuchi
 Hakozaki kawaraban net! Chiiki siryo Maidashi 1 gou kouen
 Fukuokasi Azuma-ku Maidashi kohku (公的サイト)

Geography of Fukuoka
Parks and gardens in Fukuoka